Atkinson Elementary School may refer to:

 Atkinson Elementary School (Louisville, Kentucky)
 Atkinson Elementary School (Portland, Oregon) in Portland, Oregon, formerly Atkinson Grammar School
 Edmund Atkinson School (Detroit)
 Atkinson Elementary School (Houston) - Pasadena Independent School District